Kryspinów  is a village in the administrative district of Gmina Liszki, within Kraków County, Lesser Poland Voivodeship, in southern Poland.

The village has a population of 1,360.

A local Kryspinów Lake is a popular leisure spot among Cracovians. There are two large bodies of water formed on the site of a sand mine; though these actually lie in the neighbouring village of Budzyń.

References

Villages in Kraków County